Adolphe Biarent (16 October 1871 – 4 February 1916) was a Belgian composer, conductor, cellist and music teacher.

Biarent studied at the conservatories of Brussels and of Ghent, and was a pupil of Émile Mathieu. He won a Belgian Prix de Rome with his cantata Oedipe à Colone in 1901, after which he remained near his home in Charleroi, composing, conducting and teaching (or more accurately, engaging in pedagogy, for example the writing of manuals as well). He was the teacher of Fernand Quinet.

Although still little known now, Biarent composed music that successfully combines "the structural solidity" of César Franck and Vincent d'Indy with "something of the orchestral brilliance and clarity" of Emmanuel Chabrier.

Selected works
Orchestral works
Trenmor, after Ossian (1905)
Poème Heroique (1907–11)
Rapsodie wallonne (für Klavier und Orchester) (1910)
Symphony in D minor (1908)
Deux sonnets pour violoncelle et orchestre – d`après José-Maria de Hérédia (1909-1912) 
I Le réveil d'un dieu
II Floridum Mare
Chamber music
Piano Quintet in B minor
Cello Sonata in F minor
Vocal
Song Cycle Huit mélodies pour mezzo-soprano
I Lied
II Désir de mort
III Le chant de ma mère
IV Il passa
V Chanson
VI La lune blanche luit dans les bois
VII Ballades au Hameau
VIII La chanson du vent

References

1871 births
1916 deaths
Romantic composers
Belgian classical composers
Belgian male classical composers
Belgian classical cellists
Belgian conductors (music)
Male conductors (music)
Prix de Rome (Belgium) winners
20th-century conductors (music)
20th-century Belgian male musicians
19th-century Belgian male musicians
20th-century cellists